New Caledonia Second Level is the Second division of the Fédération Calédonienne de Football in New Caledonia. It is located below the top level New Caledonia Division Honneur.

New Caledonia Second Level - Clubs

Grande Terre
AS Kunié
AS Poum
AS Wet
ASC Boulouparis
CA Saint-Louis
JS Maré
JS Ny
Mouli Sport
Olympique Nouméa
USC Nouméa

Groupe Nord 

Hienghène Sport
JS Amoa
RC Poindimié
RS Koumac
SC Gopahin  
SC Ponérihouen      
SC Xwasu 
Tiéta Sport

Groupe Sud

Poule A 
AS Auteuil
ESN
JS Traput
JS Vallée-du-Tir
Thuahaïck
Tiga Sport

Poule B
AS Païta
Central Païta 
CMO La Foa
CS Bourail
FC Bélep
Iaai FC

Football competitions in New Caledonia